The Damascus Revolutionary Military Council, also called the Military Council of Damascus and its Suburbs, was a Syrian rebel coalition affiliated with the Free Syrian Army created by Colonel Khaled Mohammed al-Hammud on 22 March 2012. It operated in the Damascus Governorate of Syria.

It claimed to be responsible for the suicide bombings at the General Staff Command of the Syrian Armed Forces in Damascus on 26 September 2012, but it is more likely that the al-Nusra Front was behind the attack.

It condemned Israel in a statement on 9 May 2013.

See also
List of armed groups in the Syrian Civil War

Notes

References

Anti-government factions of the Syrian civil war
Free Syrian Army
Military units and formations established in 2012